Robert Selden Garnett (April 26, 1789 – August 15, 1840) was a nineteenth-century politician and lawyer from Virginia. He was the brother of James M. Garnett and the first cousin of Charles F. Mercer. He served as a member of the United States House of Representatives from 1817 to 1827.

Biography
Born at "Mount Pleasant" near Loretto, Virginia, Garnett attended the College of New Jersey. He studied law and was admitted to the bar, commencing practice in Lloyds, Virginia. Garnett became a member of the Virginia House of Delegates in 1816 and 1817 and was elected to the United States House of Representatives in 1816, serving from 1817 to 1827 as both a Democratic-Republican and a Jacksonian. He was not a candidate for reelection in 1826 and instead continued to practice law in Lloyds until his death on August 15, 1840 at his estate called "Champlain" in Lloyds. He was interred in the family cemetery on the estate.

He married and had children by Charlotte de Gouges, granddaughter of France's early great feminist Olympe de Gouges, who was executed during the Reign of Terror in the Place de la Concorde.

External links

1789 births
1840 deaths
Members of the Virginia House of Delegates
Virginia lawyers
Princeton University alumni
Democratic-Republican Party members of the United States House of Representatives from Virginia
Jacksonian members of the United States House of Representatives from Virginia
19th-century American lawyers
People from Essex County, Virginia
19th-century American politicians
Garnett family of Virginia
Mercer family of Virginia